Zero Hour is a 1977 West German drama film directed by Edgar Reitz, starring Kai Taschner and Anette Jünger. The narrative is set in the summer of 1945 in a small village outside Leipzig, where the Americans have just pulled back and been replaced by Soviet troops. The film follows the inhabitants as they adjust to the new situation, in particular Joschi, a teenage Hitler Youth member who is fascinated by the Americans.

The film was produced through Edgar Reitz Filmproduktions in collaboration with Bernd Eichinger's Solaris Film- und Fernsehproduktion and Westdeutscher Rundfunk. It was released in theatres on 6 February 1977 and broadcast on West 3 on 8 March the same year.

Plot summary

Cast
 Kai Taschner as Joschi
 Anette Jünger as Isa
 Herbert Weißbach as Mattiske
 Klaus Dierig as Paul
 Günter Schiemann as Franke
 Erika Wackernagel as Mrs. Unterstab
 Torsten Henties as boy with a bike
 Erich Kleiber as Motek
 Bernd Linzel as Karl-Heinz
 Edith Kunze as Joschi's mother

References

External links
 
 
 

1977 films
1970s war drama films
German war drama films
West German films
1970s German-language films
Films directed by Edgar Reitz
Films about Nazi Germany
German World War II films
Films set in 1945
Films set in Leipzig
Grimme-Preis for fiction winners
1977 drama films
1970s German films